The Surfers Paradise Dolphins Rugby Football Club is an Australian rugby union football club that competes in the Gold Coast and District Rugby Union competition. The club is based in Broadbeach Waters, Queensland on  Queensland's Gold Coast.

History
In 1973, Col Macdonald and Barry Moon proposed the establishment of a second club on the Gold Coast, and the Surfers Paradise Dolphins club was founded in 1974. Coached by ex-Wallaby Alan Ware, the Surfers Paradise club played their first home games on the grounds of The Southport School.

See also

 Sports on the Gold Coast, Queensland
 Rugby union in Queensland
 List of Australian rugby union teams

References

External links

Rugby union teams in Queensland
Rugby clubs established in 1973
1973 establishments in Australia
Surfers Paradise, Queensland
Rugby union teams on the Gold Coast, Queensland